Democratic Abkhazia was a political party in Abkhazia.

Foundation
Democratic Abkhazia held its founding congress on 23 December 2015. The congress elected as its first Chairman Astamur Logua, formerly head of the youth wing of the Social-Democratic Party of Abkhazia, and Aleksandr Tsyshba, Oleg Minosyan, and Tamaz Khashba as Deputy Chairmen. Democratic Abkhazia positions itself as a centrist party, favouring the introduction of a mixed electoral system.

On 4 March 2016, Democratic Abkhazia rejected as inexpedient a planned referendum to hold an early presidential election.

On 1 February 2017, the Ministry for Justice invalidated Democratic Abkhazia's registration.

References

Political parties in Abkhazia
2015 establishments in Abkhazia